Kentucky Route 3519 (KY 3519) is a secondary highway located entirely in Logan County in south-central Kentucky.

Route description 
The station begins at the junction with U.S. Route 68 Business (US 68 Bus.) at the Public Square near the Logan County Courthouse. The route intersects KY 79 at that route's southern terminus. It intersects the Russellville Bypass, the current main alignment of US 68 on the north side of town. The route then goes north-northwest of town reaching the town of Epleys Station before ending at a junction with US 431 between Epleys Station and Lewisburg.

History

The entire route was the original alignment of US 431 until 2002, when the U.S. Highway was rerouted to a four-lane alignment that KY 3519 closely follows.

Major intersections

References

External links
US 431 at Kentucky Roads

U.S. Route 431
3519
3519